Yevgeny Nikolayevich Prilepin (born 7 July 1975), writing as Zakhar Prilepin, and sometimes using another pseudonym, Yevgeny Lavlinsky, is a Russian writer was the leader of the political party For Truth from 1 February 2020 until it merged into A Just Russia in February 2021.

Previously, he was a member of Russia's unregistered National Bolshevik Party from 1996 to 2019.

Biography 
Yevgeny Prilepin was born 7 July 1975 in the village of Ilyinka, Ryazan Oblast, in the family of a teacher and a nurse. His family lived there until 1984, when they moved to Dzerzhinsk. He started working at age 16 as a loader in a bread shop. He graduated from the Faculty of Philology of the Nizhny Novgorod State University and the School of Public Policy. He worked as a laborer, a security guard, and served as a squad leader in the Russian police group OMON, and subsequently took part in the fighting in Chechnya in 1996 and 1999.

In 1999, due to financial difficulties, Prilepin left OMON and got a job as a journalist at the Nizhny Novgorod newspaper Delo. He published under many pseudonyms, the most famous of which is Eugene Lavlinsky. In 2000, he became the editor of the newspaper. At the same time, Prilepin began to work on his first novel, The Pathologies.

"The newspaper, however, was horribly yellow and sometimes even reactionary, although it was part of the holding of Sergei Kiriyenko. And I realized that I spent a life for nothing – and began to write a novel. At first, it was a novel about love, but eventually (I worked for three or four years), it turned into a novel about Chechnya as about the most powerful experience of my life – as the saying goes, what we are doing always turns out to be a Kalashnikov rifle."

Works by Prilepin were published in various newspapers, including Limonka, Literary Gazette, The Edge, General Line, as well as in the magazines North, Friendship of Peoples, Roman-gazeta, New World, Snob, Russian pioneer, and Russian life. He was the chief editor of the People's Observer, the newspaper of Nizhny Novgorod's National Bolshevik Party branch. He participated in the seminar of young writers Moscow – Peredelkino (February 2004) and in the IV, V, and VI Forum of Young Writers in Moscow, Russia. He is a member of the ideological think tank the Izborsk Club.

Prilepin was a member of the banned Russian National Bolshevik Party and a supporter of the coalition The Other Russia, and took part in the organization of the Nizhny Novgorod Dissenters' March on 24 March 2007. In July 2012, he published a short essay titled "A Letter to Comrade Stalin," a Stalinist critique aimed against modern Russian "liberal society", which was widely regarded as antisemitic.

The media has repeatedly mentioned Prilepin's friendship with Vladislav Surkov, whose cousin is married to Prilepin's sister, Yelena.

In February 2017, Prilepin gave a lengthy interview, in which he revealed that he was leading a volunteer battalion in the self-proclaimed People's Republic of Donetsk. The battalion was the 4th Reconnaissance and Assault Battalion of the Special Forces of the Armed forces of DNR, commonly known as Prilepin's Battalion; Prilepin claimed it had been created in July 2016 on his initiative and announced "we will ride on a white horse into any town we've abandoned." Prilepin further said he was second in command with the rank of major. Prilepin was an influential figure and a celebrity in the DNR and the concept of Malorossiya was seemingly created by him. In late July 2018, Prilepin returned "demobilized" to Moscow; the battalion he had served in was disbanded in September 2018. In an interview with the Russian news outlet Znak.com on 15 August 2019, Prilepin claimed that the battalion had killed more Ukrainians than any other, which, however, has been disputed. He is wanted on terrorism charges in Ukraine, and was denied entry to Bosnia-Herzegovina for security reasons.

On 29 November 2018, he joined the All-Russian People's Front. Because of this, he was excluded from The Other Russia political party by its founder Eduard Limonov, who had earlier, together with party members, told Prilepin to choose between the two political structures.

On 29 October 2019, he created the public movement For Truth (За правду). He intended for the movement to be transformed into a political party that will participate in the 2021 legislative election. However, the party merged into A Just Russia in February 2021.

In January 2023, Prilepin signed a contract to join the Russian National Guard and fight in Ukraine for a second time.

Influences 
Prilepin admires Soviet novelist Leonid Leonov. Prilepin is the author of a biography of Leonov.

Prilepin's favorite authors are Gaito Gazdanov, Romain Gary, Boris Zaytsev, Thomas Mann, Henry Miller, Anatoly Marienhof, Vladimir Nabokov, Eduard Limonov, Alexander Prokhanov, Jonathan Franzen, and Mikhail Sholokhov. He lists among his favorite poetry the Silver Age of Russian Poetry, Latin American poetry, and modern Greek poetry. Prilepin's favorite poet is Sergei Yesenin

Personal life 
Prilepin is married to a woman named Maria and has two sons and two daughters: Gleb, Ignat, Kira, and Lilia. The family also has a dog named Bumblebee. Prilepin lives in Nizhny Novgorod. He also has a sister, Yelena, who lives with their mother in Dzerzhinsk. His father died in 1994.

Bibliography

Novels 
 Санькя – Sankya, Novel. Ad Marginem, Moscow 2006, 280 pages
 Патологии – The Pathologies, Novel. Andreevsky Flag, Moscow 2005, 250 pages
 Грех – Sin. Vargius, Moscow 2007
 Чёрная обезьяна (Black Ape) AST, Moscow 2012
 Обитель. (Abode) AST, Moscow 2014

Stories 
 Ботинки, полные горячей водкой. (Shoes Filled with Hot Vodka) AST, Moscow 2008
 Война. (War) AST, Moscow 2008
 Революция. (Revolution) AST, Moscow 2009

Essays 
 Я пришёл из России. (I Came from Russia) Moscow 2008
 Terra Tartarara. Это касается лично меня" (сборник эссе). (Terra Tartarara. It Personally Corncerns Me) AST, Moscow 2009
 Летучие бурлаки. (Flying Burlaks) AST, Moscow 2014

Other 
 Леонид Леонов: Игра его была огромна. (Leonid Leonov: His Play was Great) Molodaya Gvardiya, Moscow 2010
 Книгочёт. (The Bookgazer) Astrel, Moscow 2012
 Именины сердца. Разговоры с русской литературой. (Heart's birthday. Conversations with Russian Literature) AST, Moscow 2009

References

External links 

 Zahar Prilepin – official website
 Zakhar Prilepin – official blog in LJ
 Zakhar Prilepin – official blog in VK
 Zakhar Prilepin – community in VK
 Sankya – official website
 Sin – official website

1975 births
Living people
People from Skopinsky District
National Bolshevik Party politicians
Russian political writers
Russian male novelists
People of the Chechen wars
Pro-Russian people of the war in Donbas
Eighth convocation members of the State Duma (Russian Federation)
Russian individuals subject to European Union sanctions